Daniel Petersen may refer to:
 Daniel F. Petersen (born 1951), American politician from Iowa
 Daniel Frederik Petersen (1757–1816), Norwegian military officer
 Danny J. Petersen (1949–1970), posthumous recipient of the Army Medal of Honor in the Vietnam War
 Dan Petersen (born 1972), Danish footballer

See also
Daniel Peterson (disambiguation)